Kathile sub-county is a subdivision of Dodoth County, Kaabong District, Uganda.

References

Kaabong District